Epping Rugby and Netball Club is a sports club, based in Epping, New South Wales.  The senior rugby division of the club plays in the 2nd (lower grades) and 4th division (higher grades) of New South Wales Suburban Rugby Union, while the Rams Netball club plays in the Eastwood Ryde Netball Association competitions.

History 
The Epping Rugby Club started in the 1930s as Epping Juniors, giving juniors in the Epping area a chance to play rugby.

Since their inception, there have been a number of future international rugby players played for Epping's juniors.  These include:
 Steve Tuynman - 
 Matthew Burke - 
 Brett Papworth - 
 Lachlan Turner - 
 Matt Mostyn - 
 Ian Williams /
Epping added a Netball Club to the Epping Rams in 2001, competing in the Eastwood Ryde Netball Association.

In 2015, the junior club merged with Hillview Junior Rugby Club to form Central Eastwood. Epping's last season in junior rugby was in 2016, with a single team representing the club.

Senior Rugby

Epping Juniors senior rugby club
In 1960, former junior players with the Epping Rugby Club formed the Epping Juniors suburban rugby club.  Epping Juniors played in various divisions of Suburban Rugby through until 1991, winning only one premiership, the 1986 Walker Cup, before folding.  A schism occurred in the late 1980s, which resulted in some members joining another local Suburban Rugby Club, the Cavaliers. Upon folding, some remaining members joined Lane Cove, ensuring a healthy rivalry between the clubs.

The Cavaliers
The Cavaliers started as Eastwood Methodist in the early 1970s in Sydney's Protestant Church rugby competition.  They joined Suburban Rugby as Roslea in the late 1970s, before changing their name to the Cavaliers in the 1980s.  The Cavaliers won one Suburban premiership, winning the Grose Cup (2nd Grade) in 1992.

Epping Rams Seniors Restart
In 1997, the Cavaliers were invited to join the Epping Rams, as the senior club, and immediately scored success, by winning the Grose Cup (4th Division, 2nd Grade).  In 2000, the Epping Rams seniors were promoted to 3rd Division, and won the Clark Cup (3rd Division, 1st Grade) premiership the following year, in 2001.

Following a Campbell Cup (3rd Division, 3rd Grade) premiership in 2004, the Epping Rams had a great year in 2005.  After securing the 3rd Division Club Championship, Epping's 1st, 2nd and 3rd grade sides all made grand finals, with the 1st grade (Clark Cup) and 3rd grade (Campbell Cup) teams winning their premierships.

Epping were promoted to 2nd Division in 2006, but returned to 3rd Division after the 2008 season.

Following a loss in the 2011 Radford Cup (3rd Division, Colts) grand final, Epping won the 2013 edition, finishing the year as undefeated premiers.

Epping secured the 2017 3rd Division Club Championship, with first and third grade teams (as minor premiers) and colts making finals.  First grade would go on to win the Clark Cup for the third time.

Honours

Senior Rugby

Premierships
 Keith 'Doc' Harris Shield (3rd Division Club Champions) - 2005, 2017
 Clark Cup (3rd Division, 1st Grade) - 2001, 2005, 2017
 Grose Cup (4th Division, 2nd Grade) - 1992 (as Cavaliers), 1997
 Radford Cup (3rd Division, Colts) - 2013
 Blunt Cup (2nd Division, 3rd Grade) - 2020
 Campbell Cup (3rd Division, 3rd Grade) - 2004, 2005
 Walker Cup (4th Division, 3rd Grade) - 1986 (joint)

Individual Honours
 Clark Medal (Player of the Year in 3rd Division):
 Shaun Smith (2004)
 Matt Barr (2005)
 Toby Newton-McGee (2016, 2017)
 Colts Metal (Colts Player of the Year across all Colts competitions):
 Joshua Bones (2017)
 Suburban Rugby Coach of the Year
 Robert Kealy (2017)

Suburban Rugby Representative Team Honours
Opens:
 Ray Taylor - 2003
 Gareth Smith - 2014

Under 19's:
 Tim McDonald - 2007
 Toby Newton-McGee - 2007
 David Sutton - 2007

Colts 7's
 Matthew Bartholomew - 2014
 Alasdair Forrest - 2014

Notable players
Epping players who have gone on to gain international or provincial caps include: Ian Williams, Mick Mathers, Brett Papworth, Matt Mostyn, Steve Tuynman (the Club Patron), Matt Burke and Lachlan Turner.

See also 
 Rugby union in Australia
 New South Wales Suburban Rugby Union
 Rugby union in New South Wales

Footnotes

External links 
 www.eppingrams.com

Rugby union teams in Sydney
Netball teams in New South Wales
Multi-sport clubs in Australia
1930s establishments in Australia
Sports clubs established in the 1930s
Epping, New South Wales